Stéphane Stoecklin (born 12 January 1969 in Bourgoin-Jallieu, Isère) is a French handball player. 

He was voted World Player of the Year 1997 by the International Handball Federation.

With the French national team, he won a bronze medal at the 1992 Summer Olympics in Barcelona and the medals at the World Championship: silver in 1993, gold in 1995 and bronze in 1997. In the meanwhile, he has been awarded best right back at the 1996 Summer Olympics in Atlanta

With clubs, he won two French Championship in 1991 and 1993 and one Coupe de France in 1994 with USAM Nîmes. Lately he has been Bundesliga top scorer in 1998 as a GWD Minden player. The same year, he decided to go in Japan where he played 5 seasons for Honda Suzuka and won 5 times the Japan League.

References

External links 
 
 
 

1969 births
Living people
People from Bourgoin-Jallieu
French male handball players
Olympic handball players of France
Handball players at the 1992 Summer Olympics
Handball players at the 1996 Summer Olympics
Olympic bronze medalists for France
Olympic medalists in handball
Medalists at the 1992 Summer Olympics
Sportspeople from Isère
Montpellier Handball players
Handball-Bundesliga players